Nam ngiao or nam ngio is a noodle soup or curry of the cuisine of the Tai Yai people who live in the northeast of Burma, the southwest of Yunnan province, China, and in northern Thailand, mainly in Mae Hong Son Province. The dish has become famous through the northern Thai cuisine. Nam ngiao has a characteristic spicy and tangy flavor.

Ingredients
This soup is made with noodles; the most commonly used type are khanom chin, fermented rice vermicelli, although kuaitiao or other noodles may be used. Beef or pork is another main ingredient, as well as diced curdled (chicken or pork) blood cake. Chopped tomatoes give the dish a certain sour flavor and crispy roasted or fried dry chilies and garlic are added for spiciness. Another important ingredient that gives the dish its characteristic flavor is tua nao, a type of fermented soya bean that is used extensively in northern Thai cuisine and for which shrimp paste is sometimes used as a substitute. Nam ngiao is often served along with pork rinds.

The name of the dish originates either from the Thai name of the Bombax ceiba (ngio) of which the dried flower cores are an essential ingredient in the soup, or from ngiao, a derogatory term used in Northern Thailand for people of Shan descent.

Although originally a Shan dish, Nam ngiao is very popular among northern Thai people north of Phrae Province and is considered one of the auspicious dishes in Lanna tradition, being served at banquets and special occasions.

Gallery

See also 
 Khao soi
 List of soups
 List of Thai dishes (Khanom chin nam ngiao)

References

External links

Austin Bush: Food in Chiang Rai

Northern Thai cuisine
Burmese cuisine
Noodle soups
Thai noodle dishes